Péter Karádi (6 December 1926 – 7 June 2011) was a Hungarian sprinter. He competed in the men's 200 metres at the 1952 Summer Olympics.

References

1926 births
2011 deaths
Athletes (track and field) at the 1952 Summer Olympics
Hungarian male sprinters
Olympic athletes of Hungary
Athletes from Budapest